Turgut Tolgahan Sayışman (born 17 December 1981) is a Turkish actor and model. Sayışman won Manhunt International competition in 2005 in South Korea.

Life and career
Sayışman was born on 17 December 1981 in Istanbul, Turkey. He graduated from Kadıköy İntaş High School and Doğuş University, Faculty of Business Administration. Sayışman was the runner-up in the Best Model of Turkey competition, in which he participated in 2002. In 2005, he won the Manhunt International men's beauty contest in South Korea, representing Turkey. He came to attention for playing the character "Namık" in hit series Elveda Rumeli about Turks in Macedonia when the Ottoman Empire lost its European land.

Filmography

References 

1981 births
Living people
Turkish male film actors
Turkish male television actors
Turkish male models
Turkish beauty pageant winners
Male beauty pageant winners